Anosike is a surname. Notable people with the surname include:

Nicky Anosike (born 1986), American basketball player
O. D. Anosike (born 1991), American basketball player, brother of Nicky
Peter Anosike (born 1976), Nigerian footballer

Surnames of African origin